This article lists all power stations in Sudan.

Hydroelectric power stations

Thermal

See also
 Eastern Africa Power Pool
 List of power stations in Africa
 List of largest power stations in the world

References

Sudan
 
Power stations